Abiskojokk or Abiskojåkka (Northern Sami: Ábeskoeatnu) is a river in the Abisko National Park in northern Sweden. The upper part of the river is called Kamajokk or Kamajåkka.

References

Canyons and gorges of Sweden
Landforms of Norrbotten County
Rivers of Norrbotten County